Harold F. Kells (1904-1986) was a Canadian photographer known for his pictorial landscapes. His works are in the collection of the National Gallery of Canada, and the National Museum of American History.

References

External links 
 Harold F. Kells collection at the National Gallery of Canada.
 Harold F. Kells fonds at the National Gallery of Canada Library and Archives.

1904 births
1986 deaths
Canadian photographers